Chernokorovnikovo is a rural locality (a selo) in Simonovsky Selsoviet, Uglovsky District, Altai Krai, Russia. The population was 10 as of 2013. It was founded in 1893. There are 2 streets.

Geography 
Chernokorovnikovo is located 37 km northeast of Uglovskoye (the district's administrative centre) by road. Simonovo is the nearest rural locality.

References 

Rural localities in Uglovsky District, Altai Krai